Exitrons (exonic introns) are produced through alternative splicing and have characteristics of both introns and exons, but are described as retained introns. Even though they are considered introns, which are typically cut out of pre mRNA sequences, there are significant problems that arise when exitrons are spliced out of these strands, with the most obvious result being altered protein structures and functions. They were first discovered in plants, but have recently been found in metazoan species as well.

Alternative splicing 
Exitrons are a result of alternative splicing (AS), in which introns are typically cut out of a pre mRNA sequence, while exons remain in the sequence and are translated into proteins. The same sequence within a pre mRNA strand can be considered an intron or exon depending on the desired protein to be produced. As a result, different final mRNA sequences are generated and a large variety of proteins can be made from one single gene. Mutations that exist in these sequences can also alter the way in which a sequence is spliced and as a result, change the protein produced. Splicing mutations of a mRNA sequence has been found to account for 15-60% of human genetic diseases, which suggests there may be a crucial role of exitrons in organ homeostasis.

Discovery 
A previous study had looked at alternative splicing in Rockcress (Arabidopsis) plants and pinpointed characteristics of retained introns in sequences. They had a subset of what they called "cryptic introns" that did not contain stop codons and are now deemed exitrons. The same researchers conducted further studies on their newly discovered exitrons and found 1002 exitrons in 892 Rockcress genes, a flowering plant that has been used to model exitrons. Although they were discovered in plants, exitrons have also been found in other metazoan species and humans as well.

Distinguishing these regions from typical introns 
Transcripts with exitrons in their sequences can be distinguished from those with retained introns in three ways. First, transcripts containing exitrons are transported out of the nucleus to be translated, whereas those containing introns are identified as incompletely processed and are kept in the nucleus where they cannot be translated. Second, only transcripts with exitrons of lengths not divisible by three have the potential to incorporate premature termination sequences, while sequences with introns normally result in premature termination. Third, exitron transcripts are usually the major isoform, but those with introns are only present in small amounts.

Characteristics 
Exitrons are considered introns, but have characteristics of both introns and exons. They originated from ancestral coding exons, but have weaker splice site signals than other introns. Exitrons have been found to be longer and have a higher GC content than intron regions and constitutive introns. However, they are of similar size to constitutive exons and their GC content is lower compared to other exons. Exitrons lack stop codons within their sequences, have synonymous substitutions, and are most commonly found in multiples of three nucleotides. Exitron sequences contain sites for numerous post-translational modifications, including sumoylation, ubiquitylation, S-nitrosylation, and lysine acetylation. The ability of exitron splicing (EIS) to alter protein states demonstrates the effect it can have on proteome assortment.

In Arabidopsis 
Exitron splicing affects 3.3% of Arabidopsis protein coding genes. 11% of intron regions were composed of exitrons and 3.7% of AS events detected in a sample were exitron splicings. The regulation of EIS in tissues is controlled by certain stresses, which serves as a regulatory role in plant adaptation and development.

Effects 
Exitron splicing has been found to be a conserved strategy for increasing proteome plasticity in both plants and animals since it affects plant and human protein features in a similar manner. When exitrons are spliced out of a sequence, it has resulted in internally deleted proteins and affected protein domains, disordered regions, and various post-translational modification sites that impact protein function. Spliced exitrons can result in premature termination of a protein, while in contrast, a non-spliced exitron results in a full-length protein.

The processing of these exitrons has been found to be sensitive to cell types and environmental conditions and their splicing is linked to cancer. The impairment of EIS can potentially contribute to the initiation of cancer formation through its effect on several cancer related genes. These genes include cancer marker genes and genes involved in cell adhesion, migration, and metastasis.

See also

References 

DNA
Spliceosome
RNA splicing